Christopher Oteng Martin (born 14 February 1987) is a reggae/dancehall singer and songwriter from St. Catherine, Jamaica. Martin won Digicel's Rising Stars in 2005 (the Jamaican version of American Idol) and is best known for the songs "Cheaters Prayer", "I'm a big deal" "Let her go",  "Is it love"  "Dreams of brighter days" .

Biography
Born in Back Pasture, St. Catherine, 14 February 1987, to Cleveland and Maxine Martin, Martin attended the Watermount All-Age School and later went on to graduate from St. Jago High School. During high school years, he developed a love for dramatic arts and sports. In 2003, Martin graduated with various awards and accolades.

After winning the Digicel Rising Stars competition, Martin participated in Digicel's Christmas promotion in 2005. His debut single "Love Is All We Need" formed part of the promotional campaign. Martin became the first Digicel Rising Stars Alumni to have a hit single on the charts in Jamaica. Shortly after, he won the Digicel Rising Stars title in 2005.

Martin's parents have been the source of his motivation in pursuing his musical ambitions. Commenting on it, he said;  Already a national household icon, Christopher’s main objective is to take his music to the optimum level. He elaborated; 

His releases include: "Nah Go Change", "Take My Wings", "Tonight", "Giving It", and the singles "Jamaican Girls" and "Gallis" featuring Busy Signal. He has worked with a number of top producers in reggae and dancehall including Robert Livingston(Big Yard), Arif Cooper, Shane Brown(Jukeboxx) and Christopher Birch.

Martin has performed numerous stage shows across Jamaica and was notably invited to perform at One Night with Michael Bolton and at the 2008 Air Jamaica Jazz Festival. 2008 was a productive year for Martin, being nominated for numerous awards including The Jamaica Observer Teenage Choice Awards and Excellence in Music and Entertainment. With several singles receiving airplay on radio and reaching the Jamaican music charts, Martin is optimistic about his career in music: "It has been a wonderful journey so far, filled with new and promising encounters. It is also challenging but I love what I am doing, so it makes it that much easier."

The song "Melody to My Song" was released on Good Love Rhythm, produced by Baby G. The song "She Never Listens" featuring Demarco was produced by Star Kutt, and "Watch Me Lord" was produced by Ariff Cooper and released on the Fresh Ear label. In addition to those, Martin appeared on "Vibe Is Right" on the Street Bullies Medley produced by Tony Kelly as well as "Real Friends" featuring Agent Sassco (formerly Assassin) and D-Major, released via T.J Records.

In 2013, Martin signed to VP Records. In April 2016, he toured Zimbabwe and performed live on stage alongside D'Major and several Zimbabwean singers, including Winky D. This show took place at Glamis Arena in Harare and was a success.

Discography

Albums 
 Big Deal (2017)
 And Then (2019)

Extended Playlist (EP) 
 Steppin Razaor (2015)

References

External links
 
 
 

1987 births
Living people
people from Saint Catherine Parish
Jamaican reggae singers
Reggae fusion artists
VP Records artists